Ilamai is a 1985 Indian Tamil-language comedy film,  directed by Rama Narayanan and produced by Charuchithra. The film stars Arjun, Anand Babu, Jeevitha and Anitha Reddy.

Cast
Arjun as Arjun
Anand Babu as Anand
Jeevitha
Anitha Reddy
V. K. Ramasamy
Srikanth
S. S. Chandran
Manorama
Vadivukkarasi
Idichapuli Selvaraj
Gundu Kalyanam

Soundtrack

References

1985 films
1980s Tamil-language films
Films scored by Gangai Amaran
Films directed by Rama Narayanan